This is a list of cases reported in volume 305 of United States Reports, decided by the Supreme Court of the United States in 1938 and 1939.

Justices of the Supreme Court at the time of volume 305 U.S. 

The Supreme Court is established by Article III, Section 1 of the Constitution of the United States, which says: "The judicial Power of the United States, shall be vested in one supreme Court . . .". The size of the Court is not specified; the Constitution leaves it to Congress to set the number of justices. Under the Judiciary Act of 1789 Congress originally fixed the number of justices at six (one chief justice and five associate justices). Since 1789 Congress has varied the size of the Court from six to seven, nine, ten, and back to nine justices (always including one chief justice).

When the cases in volume 305 were decided the Court comprised the following eight members (Justice Cardozo had died in July 1938 and had not yet been replaced):

Notable Cases in 305 U.S.

Kellogg Company v. National Biscuit Company
In Kellogg Company v. National Biscuit Company,  305 U.S. 111 (1938), the Supreme Court ruled that the Kellogg Company was not violating any trademark or unfair competition laws when it manufactured its own Shredded Wheat breakfast cereal, which had originally been invented by the National Biscuit Company (later called Nabisco).  Kellogg's version of the product was of an essentially identical shape, and was also marketed as "Shredded Wheat"; but Nabisco's patents had expired, and its trademark application for the term "Shredded Wheat" had been turned down as a descriptive, non-trademarkable term. The Court therefore "forcefully applied the principle that once a patent has expired, its benefits are to be freely enjoyed by the public." Kellogg has been called possibly "the Supreme Court's most versatile and influential trademark decision."  It had a direct impact on the structure of the Lanham Act and is a "routine starting point for analysis in trademark opinions in lower courts."

Missouri ex rel. Gaines v. Canada, Registrar of the University of Missouri
In Missouri ex rel. Gaines v. Canada, Registrar of the University of Missouri,  305 U.S. 337 (1938), the Supreme Court held that states that provided a law school to white students had to provide similar in-state education to blacks as well. States could satisfy this requirement by allowing blacks and whites to attend the same school or by creating a second school for blacks, but when the state provides legal training, it must provide it to every qualified person to satisfy equal protection. It can neither send them to other states, nor condition that training for one group of people, such as blacks, on levels of demand from that group. Key to the court's conclusion was that there was no provision for legal education of blacks in Missouri so Missouri law guaranteeing equal protection applied.

Federal court system 

Under the Judiciary Act of 1789 the federal court structure at the time comprised District Courts, which had general trial jurisdiction; Circuit Courts, which had mixed trial and appellate (from the US District Courts) jurisdiction; and the United States Supreme Court, which had appellate jurisdiction over the federal District and Circuit courts—and for certain issues over state courts. The Supreme Court also had limited original jurisdiction (i.e., in which cases could be filed directly with the Supreme Court without first having been heard by a lower federal or state court). There were one or more federal District Courts and/or Circuit Courts in each state, territory, or other geographical region.

The Judiciary Act of 1891 created the United States Courts of Appeals and reassigned the jurisdiction of most routine appeals from the district and circuit courts to these appellate courts. The Act created nine new courts that were originally known as the "United States Circuit Courts of Appeals." The new courts had jurisdiction over most appeals of lower court decisions. The Supreme Court could review either legal issues that a court of appeals certified or decisions of court of appeals by writ of certiorari. On January 1, 1912, the effective date of the Judicial Code of 1911, the old Circuit Courts were abolished, with their remaining trial court jurisdiction transferred to the U.S. District Courts.

List of cases in volume 305 U.S. 

[a] Roberts took no part in the case
[b] Reed took no part in the case
[c] McReynolds took no part in the case
[d] Brandeis took no part in the case

Notes and references

External links
  Case reports in volume 305 from Library of Congress
  Case reports in volume 305 from Court Listener
  Case reports in volume 305 from the Caselaw Access Project of Harvard Law School
  Case reports in volume 305 from Google Scholar
  Case reports in volume 305 from Justia
  Case reports in volume 305 from Open Jurist
 Website of the United States Supreme Court
 United States Courts website about the Supreme Court
 National Archives, Records of the Supreme Court of the United States
 American Bar Association, How Does the Supreme Court Work?
 The Supreme Court Historical Society